Empress Karen Carreon Schuck-Guingona (born 19 February 1993), also known mononymously as Empress, is a Filipino actress, model, singer, dancer and fashion designer.

Early life
Schuck was born on 19 February 1993 in Quezon City to a Filipino-German events singer Hans Schuck and a Filipino mother. 
She is the 4th child among six siblings. She has three brothers; Hans Erard, Prince Justin, Vhonrich and King Matthew and a sister actress Princess Schuck.

Career
Schuck started in Vaseline shampoo commercial as a model when she was 7 years old in 1999.

In 2000 Schuck was discovered by ABS-CBN when she was 8 years old. At 11 years old, Schuck appeared in Bida Si Mister, Bida Si Misis. Schuck's first movie was 9 Mornings, when she was 9 years old.

In 2003 she won the Most Popular Child Actress in the 2003 Guillermo Mendoza Memorial Scholarship Foundation.

Schuck was seen on GMA Network when she played the role of Young Cassopeia in Etheria. She also appeared in Super Inggo as Ava Avaniko. Schuck was known as Hillary in Star Magic Presents: Abt Ur Luv and Star Magic Presents: Abt Ur Luv, Ur Lyf 2.

She appeared on Your Song Presents: Underage where she played the role of Cecilia.

On 9 February 2015, Schuck appeared in the drama series Kailan Ba Tama ang Mali?.

As of 2017, she is already a freelancer actress but more usually appears in GMA Network.

In 2018 she portrayed a young version of Lilet in My Special Tatay.

Personal life
Schuck has a daughter Athalia with her husband, Vino Guingona, grandson of former Philippine Vice President Teofisto Guingona Jr. and nephew of former senator Teofisto Guingona III. On 6 March 2021, the couple tied their knot at the Hillcreek Gardens in Tagaytay, Cavite.

Filmography

Television

Film

Music videos

Awards and nominations

References

External links

1993 births
Living people
Filipino child actresses
Filipino film actresses
Filipino people of German descent
Filipino television actresses
Filipino female models
German female models
Star Magic
ABS-CBN personalities
GMA Network personalities
Viva Artists Agency
Filipina gravure idols